Jean-Vivien Bantsimba (born 1 September 1982 in Paris) is a French-Congolese football player. Currently, he plays in the Championnat de France amateur for FC Mulhouse.

External links
 
 

1982 births
Living people
Republic of the Congo footballers
French sportspeople of Republic of the Congo descent
Footballers from Paris
French footballers
FC Mulhouse players
Pau FC players
US Raon-l'Étape players
Association football midfielders
Republic of the Congo international footballers
Black French sportspeople